Burge is a surname. Notable people with the surname include:
Albert Burge (1889–1943), Australian Rugby player
Bella Burge (1877-1962), music hall performer and boxing promoter
Benjamin Burge (born 1980), Australian sport shooter
Billy Burge (1931–2004), American pool player
Brent Burge, sound editor
Christopher Burge, Professor of Biology and Biological Engineering at Massachusetts Institute of Technology
Cliff Burge, former Australian rules footballer who played with Melbourne
Constance M. Burge, creator of the Charmed TV series
David Burge (1930–2013), American pianist, conductor and composer
Dianne Burge (born 1943), former Australian sprinter 
Donald Albert Burge (born 1935), successful businessman within the ESSO group, managing teams across the world and establishing ESSO in both Japan and Singapore 
Dora Madison Burge(born 1990), sometimes credited professionally as Madison Burge and Dora Madison, is an American actress
Frank Burge (born 1894), one of the greatest forwards in the history of rugby league in Australia
Fred Burge (1923–2018), Australian rules footballer
Gary M. Burge (born 1952), American author and professor
Gerard Burge (1857–1933), English first-class cricketer active 1885–86
Gregg Burge (1957–1998), tap dancer and choreographer
Heather Burge (born 1971), retired professional basketball player
Heidi Burge (born 1971), retired professional basketball player
Hubert Murray Burge, Anglican Bishop
James Burge (1906–1990), English criminal law barrister, defended Stephen Ward in the Profumo Affair in 1963
Jennifer Burge (born 1970), American travel memoirist and speaker on global living
Jeremy Burge (born 1984), emoji historian, founder of Emojipedia, creator of World Emoji Day
John Burge (born 1961), Canadian composer, music educator, and pianist
Jon Burge (1947-2018),  American convicted felon, former Chicago Police Department detective, commander, and torturer
Joseph Burge (born 1952), Guatemalan former wrestler who competed in the 1972 Summer Olympics
Keith Burge (born 1950), Welsh former football referee
Laidley Burge, represented New South Wales in rugby league
Lee Burge (born 1993), English professional footballer
Les Burge (1917–1996), minor league baseball first baseman and manager
Marcel Burge (born 1972), Swiss rifle shooter
Maude Burge (1865–1957), New Zealand painter
Pery Burge (1955–2013), English artist
Peter Burge (athlete) (born 1974), former Australian long and triple jumper
Peter Burge (cricketer) (1932–2001), Australian cricketer
Peter Burge (rugby) (1884–1956), Australian rugby footballer and coach
Phillip Scott Burge, MC (1895–1918), First World War fighter pilot and flying ace
Robert Burge (born 1905), rugby union player who represented Australia
Ronald Burge (born 1932), former Professor of Physics at King's College London
Ross Burge, New Zealand musician, who has played drums in bands
Ryan Burge (born 1988), English footballer
Sarah Burge (born 1960), British cosmetic surgery proponent
Sheridan Burge-Lopez (born 1970), Australian swimmer
Stuart Burge (1918–2002), English film director, actor and producer
Tristan Burge (born 1985), American football safety
Tyler Burge (born 1946), Professor of Philosophy at UCLA
Vernon Burge (1888–1971), aviation pioneer
Wendy Burge, American figure skater
William Burge (1786–1849), British lawyer and Privy Councillor

See also
Burdge
Burge Family, an Australian family of footballing brothers who represented Australia at rugby union and rugby league between 1907 and 1922
Burge sisters
Burge, alternate name for Törbel, hamlet in the Visp district in the Canton of Valais in Switzerland
Frances Irene Burge Griswold (1826–1900), American poet and author
Burge House, house located in Houston, Texas, United States, listed on the National Register of Historic Places
Peter Burge Oval, cricket ground in Brisbane, Australia
Burge Plantation, historic farm estate in Newborn, Georgia
Harold Burge Robson (1888–1964), British soldier, barrister and Liberal Party politician
Bourge
Bourgue